Tod Williams Billie Tsien Architects (also known as Tod Williams Billie Tsien Architects | Partners) are a husband-and-wife architectural firm founded in 1986, based in New York. Williams and Tsien began working together in 1977. Their studio focuses on work for institutions including museums, schools, and nonprofit organizations.

Tod Williams 
Tod Williams (born 1943, Detroit, Michigan) received his undergraduate, MFA, and Master of Architecture degrees from Princeton University, New Jersey after graduating from the Cranbrook School in Bloomfield Hills. He is the father of model Rachel Williams and filmmaker Tod "Kip" Williams, both by his first wife, dancer Patricia Agnes Jones, whom he met while studying at Princeton.  Williams is a Fellow of the American Academy in Rome and serves as a trustee of the Cranbrook Educational Community. He has been inducted into the American Academy of Arts and Letters, National Academy, American Philosophical Society (2017), and American Academy of Arts and Sciences.

Billie Tsien 
Billie Tsien (born 1949, Ithaca, New York) received her undergraduate degree in Fine Arts from Yale University and her M. Arch. from UCLA. She has worked with Williams since 1977 and they have been in partnership since 1986. Tsien is currently President of the Architectural League of New York and Director of the Public Art Fund.  She has been inducted into the American Academy of Arts and Letters, National Academy, the American Philosophical Society, and American Academy of Arts and Sciences. Tsien was one of the recipients of the Visionary Woman Awards presented by Moore College of Art and Design in 2009.

Teaching 
Williams and Tsien have taught at the Cooper Union, Harvard University, Cornell University, University of Texas, City College of New York,Yale University, and University of Chicago.

Recognition 
Williams and Tsien are the recipients of more than two dozen awards from the American Institute of Architects. They received a 2014 International Fellowship from the Royal Institute of British Architects and the 2013 Firm of the Year Award from the American Institute of Architects. In 2013, each was awarded a National Medal of Arts from President Obama. They have received the American Academy of Arts and Letters’ Brunner Award, the New York City AIA Medal of Honor, the Cooper-Hewitt National Design Award, the Thomas Jefferson Medal in Architecture, the Municipal Art Society’s Brendan Gill Prize, and the Chrysler Award for Innovation in Design.

A selection of works 
David Geffen Hall, New York, NY, (2024)
Obama Presidential Center, Chicago, IL (2021)
Andlinger Center for Energy and the Environment, Princeton University, Princeton, NJ (2015)
Tata Consultancy Services, Banyan Park, Mumbai, India (2014)
LeFrak Center at Lakeside, Prospect Park, NY (2013)
Savidge Library Addition, The MacDowell Colony, Peterborough, NH (2013)
Asia Society Hong Kong Centre, Admiralty, Hong Kong (2012)
Barnes Foundation, Philadelphia, PA (2012)
Reva and David Logan Center for the Arts, University of Chicago (2012)
Kim & Tritton Residence Halls, Haverford College, Haverford, PA (2012)
Center for the Advancement of Public Action, Bennington College, Bennington, VT (2011)
David Rubinstein Atrium at Lincoln Center, New York, NY (2009)
C.V. Starr East Asian Library, University of California, Berkeley, CA (2008)
Skirkanich Hall for bioengineering, University of Pennsylvania, Philadelphia (2006)
Phoenix Art Museum, Phoenix, AZ (2006, 1996)
The Robin Hood Foundation Library Initiative, various locations, New York, NY (2004-5)
First Congregational United Church of Christ, Washington, DC (2001)
American Folk Art Museum, 45 and 47 West 53rd Street, New York, NY (2001)
Mattin Center (a student arts and activities center), Johns Hopkins University, Baltimore, MD (2001)
Cranbrook Natatorium, Cranbrook Schools, Bloomfield Hills, MI (1999)
Helen S. Cheels Aquatic Center, Emma Willard School, Troy, NY (1998)
Hunter Science Center, Emma Willard School, Troy, NY (1996)
The Neurosciences Institute on the campus of The Scripps Research Institute, San Diego, CA (1995)
Hereford College, University of Virginia, Charlottesville, VA (1992)
Whitney Museum of American Art Downtown Branch, New York, NY (1988)
Feinberg Hall, Princeton University, Princeton, NJ (1986)

Selected publications 

 Art and Use. School of Architecture and Planning, University of Buffalo, The State University of New York, 2007 
 Work/Life. Monacelli Press, 2000. 
 “The Physical Space of Science: The Neurosciences Institute and Skirkanich Hall.” Cell Cycle (Georgetown, Tex.), vol. 9, no. 1, Taylor & Francis, 2010, pp. 28–31. 
 “Domestic Arrangements: A Lab Report. Tod Williams and Billie Tsien.” Design Quarterly (Minneapolis, Minn.), no. 152, The MIT Press, 1991, pp. 21–28. 
 “Peas and Carrots.” Oz, vol. 18, no. 1, 1996. 
 “Talking Houses.” Oz, vol. 25, no. 1, 2003. 
 “Roxy Paine.” Bomb (New York, N.Y.), no. 107, New Art Publications, 2009, pp. 38–45. 
 “Liberty.” Heresies, no. 11, Heresies Collective, Inc, 1981, p. 38.

References

Sources
Tod Williams, "Ascension", in Archipelago: Essays on Architecture, edited by P. MacKeith, Helsinki, Rakennustieto, 2006
Billie Tsien, "The cuts through the heart", in Archipelago: Essays on Architecture.
Tod Williams and Billie Tsien, The 1998 Charles and Ray Eames Lecture, Michigan Architecture Papers, University of Michigan Press, 1999.
 Douglas Heller, Tod Williams Billie Tsien and Associates: An Annotated Bibliography, Council of Planning Librarians, 1993.
Tod Williams and Billie Tsien, Work/Life, New York, Monacelli Press, 2000.
Kester Rattenbury, Robert Bevan, and Kieran Long, Architects Today, New York, Laurence King Publishing, 2006.

External links 
Tod Williams Billie Tsien Architects Homepage
“Meadow Lane Residence, Southampton, New York, USA : Tod Williams Billie Tsien.” 2019. GA Houses, no. 165 (July): 44–59. 
Stephens, Suzanne. 2020. “Back in the Hood: Record Returns to Tod Williams Billie Tsien Architects’ Redo of a Charles Moore Museum.” Architectural Record 208 (2): 62–65
Williams, Tod, Billie Tsien, and Josephine Minutillo. “Tod Williams and Billie Tsien: The Husband-and-Wife Team behind the New Barnes Foundation Building Discusses the Creative Process and Why Smart Architects Work in Pairs.” Architectural Digest 69, no. 6 (June 1, 2012): 62. 

American women architects
Architecture firms based in New York City
Tod Williams Billie Tsien Architects
Williams, Tod
Harvard University faculty
Yale School of Architecture faculty
United States National Medal of Arts recipients
University of Michigan faculty
Members of the American Philosophical Society
American architects of Chinese descent
University of California, Los Angeles alumni
American women academics